Satirical Theatre Kerempuh or Kerempuh Theatre, is a theatre in Zagreb, Croatia founded in 1964 by the notable theatre and movie director Fadil Hadžić. It is located on a slope behind Ilica street 31.

History and specifications
It was originally founded in 1964 by Fadil Hadžić as a cabaret under the name "Jazavac". It is a 600 seats satirical theatre named after a folk hero that ridicules the powerful.

References

External links
Official website

Theatres in Zagreb